Lubiczyn  is a village in the administrative district of Gmina Dębowa Kłoda, within Parczew County, Lublin Voivodeship, in eastern Poland.

The village has a population of 220.

References

Lubiczyn